Getting Away with Murder: The JonBenet Ramsey Mystery is a docudrama television movie based on the 1996 murder of JonBenét Ramsey. The film was directed by Edward Lucas; JonBenét Ramsey was played by Julia Granstrom. It aired on FOX on February 16, 2000 and was produced by Rocket Science Laboratories.

See also
 The Case of: JonBenét Ramsey
 Perfect Murder, Perfect Town

External links
 

2000 television films
2000 films
American biographical films
Fox network original films
Killing of JonBenét Ramsey
2000s American films
Television series by Rocket Science Laboratories